Gaddam Ganga Reddy (born 12 July 1933 in Keshpally, Nizamabad district, (Andhra Pradesh)) is a leader of Telugu Desam Party from Andhra Pradesh. He served as member of the Lok Sabha representing Nizamabad (Lok Sabha constituency). He was elected to 10th, 12th and 13th Lok Sabha.

References

India MPs 1991–1996
People from Nizamabad district
1933 births
Living people
Telugu Desam Party politicians
India MPs 1998–1999
India MPs 1999–2004
Lok Sabha members from Andhra Pradesh